Bibel is a surname. Notable people with the surname include:

 Leon Bibel (1913–1995), American painter and printmaker
 Wolfgang Bibel (born 1938), German computer scientist and mathematician

See also